Magomed Shamilovich Magomedov (born 22 July 1997) is a Russian football player. He plays for Rotor Volgograd.

Club career
He made his debut in the Russian Professional Football League for FC Anzhi-2 Makhachkala on 19 July 2017 in a game against FC Chernomorets Novorossiysk.

He made his debut for the main squad of FC Anzhi Makhachkala on 20 September 2017 in a Russian Cup game against FC Luch-Energiya Vladivostok.

He made his Russian Premier League debut for Anzhi on 26 May 2019 in a game against FC Ural Yekaterinburg, as a 66th-minute substitute for Apti Akhyadov.

References

External links
 
 Profile by Russian Professional Football League
 

1997 births
Footballers from Moscow
Living people
Russian footballers
FC Anzhi Makhachkala players
FC Rotor Volgograd players
Association football midfielders
Russian Premier League players